Worthing is a city in Lincoln County, South Dakota, United States and is a suburb of Sioux Falls. The population was 927 at the 2020 census.

History
Worthing was laid out in 1879, and named after a railroad employee.

Geography
Worthing is located at  (43.328868, -96.766593).

Worthing has been assigned the ZIP code 57077 and the FIPS place code 72820.

Demographics

2010 census
As of the census of 2010, there were 877 people, 325 households, and 236 families residing in the town. The racial makeup of the town was 96.6% White, 1.0% Black or African-American, 0.8% Native American, 0.3% Asian, 0.0% from other races, and 1.3% from two or more races. Hispanic or Latino of any race were 0.7% of the population.

There were 325 households, of which 44.6% had children under the age of 18 living with them, 60.6% were married couples living together, 8.3% had a female householder with no husband present, and 27.4% were non-families. 18.8% of all households were made up of individuals, and 5.9% had someone living alone who was 65 years of age or older. The average household size was 2.7 and the average family size was 3.13.

In the town the population was spread out, with 27.9% under the age of 15, 10.6% from 15 to 24, 36.4% from 25 to 44, 21.0% from 45 to 64, and 5.1% who were 65 years of age or older. The median age was 29.2 years. Males make up 49.9% compared to 50.1% for females.

2000 census
As of the census of 2000, there were 585 people, 206 households, and 163 families residing in the town. The population density was 1,276.7 people per square mile (491.0/km2). There were 213 housing units at an average density of 464.9 per square mile (178.8/km2). The racial makeup of the town was 98.97% White, 0.51% Native American, 0.17% Asian, 0.17% from other races, and 0.17% from two or more races. Hispanic or Latino of any race were 0.51% of the population.

There were 206 households, out of which 47.1% had children under the age of 18 living with them, 68.4% were married couples living together, 6.8% had a female householder with no husband present, and 20.4% were non-families. 14.6% of all households were made up of individuals, and 4.4% had someone living alone who was 65 years of age or older. The average household size was 2.84 and the average family size was 3.16.

In the town the population was spread out, with 30.6% under the age of 18, 9.4% from 18 to 24, 38.5% from 25 to 44, 16.6% from 45 to 64, and 5.0% who were 65 years of age or older. The median age was 29 years. For every 100 females, there were 103.1 males. For every 100 females age 18 and over, there were 100.0 males.

Education
Worthing is a part of the Lennox School District 41-4, which operates Worthing Elementary, and LWC Junior High School/Lennox High School.

References

External links

Cities in Lincoln County, South Dakota
Cities in South Dakota
Sioux Falls, South Dakota metropolitan area